Löbe and Loebe are German surnames, and Loebe is also a given name.

Notable people with the surname include:
 Bernd Loebe (born 1952), German journalist, opera manager and festival manager
 János Löbe (born 1995), German football player
 Loebe Julie (1920-2015), American engineer
 Paul Löbe (1875-1967), German politician
 Rebecca Loebe (born 1983), American musician, singer-songwriter, and record producer

See also
 Lobe (disambiguation)
 Löbel